Pouteria altissima is a species of plant in the family Sapotaceae, and a source of anigre hardwood. It is found in Burundi, Cameroon, Central African Republic, the Republic of the Congo, the Democratic Republic of the Congo, Ivory Coast, Ethiopia, Gabon, Ghana, Guinea, Kenya, Nigeria, Rwanda, Sierra Leone, Sudan, Tanzania, and Uganda. It is threatened by habitat loss.

References

altissima
Conservation dependent plants
Taxonomy articles created by Polbot